The Scottish Rite Cathedral in New Castle, Pennsylvania, United States, was designed by Milwaukee architect R. G. Schmidt and built in 1925. First used in November, 1926, as a meeting place for Masonic groups, it is listed in the National Register of Historic Places in Lawrence County, Pennsylvania. Unable to pay taxes during the Great Depression, the Masons lost the building to the county, but reacquired it in 1940 with the creation of the Cathedral Foundation. This non-profit foundation continues to operate the Cathedral today.

History 

John S. Wallace, a Masonic official and first Commander-In-Chief of the New Castle area, desired a building large enough to accommodate all Masonic groups. Though the land on which the Cathedral sits was purchased in 1918, additional land was bought in 1921, 1923, and 1924. Because the builders ran into quicksand, piling had to be added to the back of the building to ensure the structure was sound. At the time it was built, the Cathedral was the largest facility between New York and Chicago.

Today 

The Cathedral continues to be used today for wedding receptions, banquets, and most notably for performances by the Pittsburgh Symphony Orchestra. The auditorium in which the symphony performs has a seating capacity of 2,834, and a stage that is 82 feet wide, 46 feet deep, and 65 feet high.

References

External links 

SAH Archipedia Building Entry

Masonic buildings completed in 1926
Clubhouses on the National Register of Historic Places in Pennsylvania
New Castle
Music venues in Pennsylvania
Buildings and structures in Lawrence County, Pennsylvania
New Castle, Pennsylvania
National Register of Historic Places in Lawrence County, Pennsylvania